Benjamin Laney may refer to:

 Benjamin Lany (or Laney) (1591–1675), bishop
 Benjamin Travis Laney (1896–1977), Democratic Governor of Arkansas